Make Them Suffer is an Australian metalcore band from Perth, formed in 2008. They are currently signed to Greyscale Records. Their debut studio album Neverbloom peaked at No. 56 on the ARIA Album charts in June 2012, and showcased the band's earlier mix of metalcore, blackened death metal, and symphonic metal. Its follow-up Old Souls debuted at No. 30 upon release in May 2015 and displayed the band beginning to transition from death/black metal to a more progressive metalcore sound. After the band signed with Rise, the label released an expanded version of Old Souls in August 2016, containing also an EP from their death metal era Lord of Woe (originally self-released in 2010) and a new track, "Ether".

History
They self-released their debut EP, Lord of Woe, on 27 September 2010. In February 2012, the group signed with Roadrunner Records and in May that year released their debut studio album Neverbloom. They released a single entitled "Let Me In" on 12 May 2014.

On 29 May 2015, Make Them Suffer released their second studio album entitled Old Souls. The band signed to Rise Records internationally in January 2016. On 14 June 2016, they released a new track titled "Ether".

On 7 June 2017, the band released the single "Fireworks" and announced their third studio album Worlds Apart, released in July of that year. On 9 June, it was announced that Chris Arias-Real, Lachlan Monty, and Louisa Burton were no longer in the band. Jaya Jeffery was announced as the new bassist and Booka Nile was announced as the new keyboardist.

On 24 July 2018, a new single "27" was released. In September 2018, the band toured America with After the Burial and the Acacia Strain. In December 2018, a North American tour with Kingdom of Giants, Chelsea Grin, and Born of Osiris was announced to take place in 2019.

They have toured with many notable bands, including Architects, Thy Art Is Murder, Parkway Drive, The Amity Affliction, Pvris, Bleeding Through, Stick to Your Guns, Northlane, August Burns Red, Oceano, Job for a Cowboy, Whitechapel, and War from a Harlots Mouth. The band completed a headlining world tour in 2017 in support of the Worlds Apart album through Canada, USA, Europe, UK and Australia with supporting acts Wage War, Enterprise Earth, Novelists, Spite, and Alpha Wolf.

On 19 June 2020, the band released their fourth studio album How to Survive a Funeral. In 2022, keyboardist and clean vocalist Booka Nile took time away from the band during COVID-19 pandemic to appear on the eighth season of Married at First Sight.   
   
On 24 February 2022, the band announced via their Twitter that Booka Nile was no longer a member of the band. On 13 October, the band announced Alex Reade from Drown This City as their new keyboardist, and they have released their first song with Reade, "Doomswitch".

Musical style
Make Them Suffer's musical style has been described as metalcore, progressive metalcore, symphonic death metal, and deathcore. Their earlier musical style has been described as blackened death metal.

Members 

Current
 Sean Harmanis – unclean vocals (2008–present)
 Nick McLernon – lead guitar, backing vocals (2008–present); rhythm guitar (2016–present)
 Jaya Jeffery – bass (2017–present; touring member 2016)
 Jordan Mather – drums (2018–present; touring member 2017)
 Alex Reade – keyboards, piano, clean vocals (2022–present)

Former
 Richard West – rhythm guitar (2008–2009)
 Heather Menaglio – keyboards, piano (2008–2011)
 Cody Brooks – rhythm guitar, backing vocals (2009–2011)
 Craig Buckingham – rhythm guitar (2011–2013)
 Lachlan Monty – rhythm guitar (2013–2016)
 Chris Arias-Real – bass (2008–2017)
 Louisa Burton – keyboards, piano, clean vocals (2011–2017)
 Tim Madden – drums (2008–2018)
 Booka Nile – keyboards, piano, clean vocals (2017–2022)

Timeline

Discography

Studio albums

Extended plays

Singles

Awards and nominations

AIR Awards
The Australian Independent Record Awards (known colloquially as the AIR Awards) is an annual awards night to recognise, promote and celebrate the success of Australia's Independent Music sector.

! 
|-
| 2021
| How to Survive a Funeral
| Best Independent Heavy Album or EP
| 
| 
|}

References

Deathcore musical groups
Australian metalcore musical groups
Australian death metal musical groups
Musical groups from Perth, Western Australia
2007 establishments in Australia
Musical groups established in 2007
Roadrunner Records artists